Scale-free may refer to:

 Scale-free ideal gas
 Scale-free network